Zwollerkerspel (Low Saxon: Zwollerkärspel) is a former municipality in the province of Overijssel, Netherlands. It covered the countryside around the city of Zwolle. Zwollerkerspel was a separate municipality from 1802 until August 1, 1967, when it became a part of Zwolle, Hasselt, Heino, IJsselmuiden and Genemuiden.

See also
 Richard Hutten

References

External links
Map of the former municipality in 1868

Former municipalities of Overijssel
Zwolle